44th Regiment may refer to:

British Army
 44th (East Essex) Regiment of Foot
 Essex Regiment, amalgamation of the 44th and the 56th (West Essex) Regiment of Foot
 3rd East Anglian Regiment (16th/44th Foot), formed from the Essex regiment
 Royal Anglian Regiment formed from the 3rD East Anglian Regiment.  The 3rd battalion is known as the "3rd (16th/44th Foot) Battalion"
 44th Searchlight Regiment
 44th Royal Tank Regiment

British Indian Army
 44th Merwara Infantry

United States
 44th Infantry Regiment (United States)
 44th Air Defense Artillery Regiment

American Civil War regiments

Union
 44th Illinois Volunteer Infantry Regiment
 44th Indiana Infantry Regiment
 44th Iowa Volunteer Infantry Regiment
 44th New York Volunteer Infantry Regiment
 44th Ohio Infantry
 44th Wisconsin Volunteer Infantry Regiment
 44th United States Colored Infantry

Confederate States
 44th Alabama Infantry Regiment
 44th Arkansas Infantry (Mounted)
 44th Georgia Volunteer Infantry
 44th North Carolina Infantry
 44th Tennessee Infantry Regiment
 44th Virginia Infantry

South Africa
44 Parachute Regiment (South Africa)
44 Parachute Anti-Aircraft Regiment

See also 
44th Brigade (disambiguation)
44th Division (disambiguation)